Callimetopus pantherinus is a species of beetle in the family Cerambycidae. It was described by Blanchard in 1855. It is known from Moluccas.

References

Callimetopus
Beetles described in 1855